Highway is a 2022 Indian Telugu-language mystery crime thriller film written and directed by K. V. Guhan and, produced by Venkat Talari through Sree Iswarya Lakshmi Movies and Northstar Entertainment. The film features Anand Deverakonda, Manasa Radhakrishnan (in her Telugu debut) and Abhishek Banerjee (in his Telugu debut) in primary roles. Highway was premiered on Aha on 19 August 2022.

Plot

Cast 

 Anand Deverakonda as Vishnu
 Manasa Radhakrishnan as Tulasi
 Abhishek Banerjee as D
 Saiyami Kher as Asha Bharath
 John Vijay
 Reshma Pasupuleti
 Satya as Samudram

Production 
After watching Abhishek Banerjee's performance in the Hindi web series Paatal Lok, Guhan cast him for the role of a serial killer. The film's launch event with a puja ceremony was held in May 2021. It was extensively shot on the highways near Hyderabad, Araku Valley and Chikmagalur in approximately forty days. Filming was wrapped up in October 2021.

Soundtrack 
The film score and soundtrack album of the film is composed by Simon K. King. The music rights were acquired by Aditya Music.

Release and reception 
Highway was premiered on Aha on 19 August 2022.

Neeshita Nyayapati of The Times of India gave a rating of 2 out of 5 and wrote that "Highway is passable fare at best, but given the kind of talent involved in the project, you can’t help but wonder if the story had the potential to be fleshed out better". Balakrishna Ganeshan of The News Minute also gave same rating and wrote that "Highway sticks true to the crime thriller genre without meandering into unnecessary details or scenes". Pinkvilla too rated the film 2 out of 5 and stated "Highway is barely clued into the emerging plot devices in the Indian OTT space, especially those concerning crime thrillers, which have long ceased to present obvious formats".

Writing for The Hindu, Sangeetha Devi Dundoo opined that the film "unfolds on familiar lines and delivers thrills from time to time. However, it falls short in the final portions that seem stretched and dilute the potential for a nail-biting finish". India Today's Roktim Rajpal stated: "Highway had the potential to be a dark and disturbing thriller but it ends up being a damp squib".

References

External links 

 
 Highway on Aha

2022 films
Indian crime thriller films
2022 crime thriller films
2020s Telugu-language films
Films set in Visakhapatnam
Films set in Andhra Pradesh
Films set in Bangalore
Films set in Hyderabad, India
Films set in Karnataka
2020s mystery thriller films
Indian mystery thriller films
Films shot in Hyderabad, India
Films shot in Andhra Pradesh
Films shot in Karnataka
Aha (streaming service) original films